The 2018–19 season was Lille OSC's 75th season in existence and the club's 19th consecutive season in the top flight of French football.

Players

Squad information

Out on loan

Reserve team

Competitions

Ligue 1

League table

Results summary

Results by round

Matches

Coupe de France

Coupe de la Ligue

Statistics

Appearances and goals

|-
! colspan="12" style="background:#dcdcdc; text-align:center"| Goalkeepers

|-
! colspan="12" style="background:#dcdcdc; text-align:center"| Defenders

|-
! colspan="12" style="background:#dcdcdc; text-align:center"| Midfielders

|-
! colspan="12" style="background:#dcdcdc; text-align:center"| Forwards

|-
! colspan="12" style="background:#dcdcdc; text-align:center"| Players transferred out during the season

|-

References

Lille OSC seasons
Lille OSC